Liudhard (modern , also Letard in English) was a Frankish bishop – of where is unclear – and the chaplain of Queen Bertha of Kent, whom she brought with her from the continent upon her marriage to King Æthelberht of Kent. A short ways east of Canterbury he helped found and dedicate to Saint Martin of Tours the first Christian Saxon church in England, St Martin's, still serving as the oldest church in the English-speaking world.

He is believed to have died in the late 590s, soon after the arrival of Saint Augustine with the Gregorian mission, but Bede fails to mention him in any detail. He was originally buried in St Martin's Church, but Archbishop Laurence of Canterbury had his remains removed and buried in the Abbey Church of St Peter and St Paul in the early 7th century.  He was regarded locally as a saint, and Goscelin recounts the story of a miracle he performed to help the eleventh-century artist and abbot Spearhafoc, who in thanks adorned his tomb, with "statues of enormous size and beauty" of the saint and Bertha.

According to Goscelin, while Spearhafoc was working on metal figures at St Augustine's Abbey in Canterbury, he lost a valuable ring given him by Edward's queen, and Godwin's daughter, Edith of Wessex, presumably as materials to use in his project.  In his distress, he prayed to Liudhard, after which the ring was found.  In gratitude, he adorned Liudhard's tomb with the statues.  From other mentions it would seem such a description would mean the statues were at least approaching life-size.  Also according to Goscelin and William of Malmesbury, Liudhard "was especially good at speedily responding to appeals for rain", for which purpose his remains would be carried in procession to the fields.

A coin or "medalet", known as the Liudhard medalet, bearing his name was found in the 19th century in a grave in Canterbury, and is the earliest Anglo-Saxon coin, though it may not have been used as money in the normal way.  The design is clearly based on contemporary Continental coins, but has unusual features.

References

Sources
Dodwell, C. R. (1982) Anglo-Saxon Art, A New Perspective, Manchester UP, . Miracle, p. 213
Wernher, Martin (1992) "The Liudhard Medalet", in Anglo-Saxon England, Volume 20, eds. Michael Lapidge, et al. Cambridge University Press , 9780521413800, google books

Christian chaplains
People from Canterbury
Anglo-Saxon saints
Gregorian mission
6th-century Frankish bishops
590s deaths
Year of birth unknown